Johnny Lee Brewer (March 8, 1937 – May 27, 2011) was an American football tight end and linebacker in the NFL for the Cleveland Browns and New Orleans Saints.  He played college football at the University of Mississippi.

Brewer was a fourth round selection by the Cleveland Browns in the 1960 NFL Draft, and was also selected by the Minneapolis AFL teamof the newly-formed American Football League. The Browns also selected Ole Miss teammates Bobby Franklin in the eleventh round and Robert Khayat in the sixth round.

He was a member of the Browns teams that won the NFL championship in 1964 over the heavily favored Baltimore Colts and the 1965 Eastern Conference championship team that lost the title game to the Green Bay Packers.

Brewer played slot end/tight end for the Browns until 1966 when he was converted to linebacker with the impending retirement of linebacker Galen Fiss and the presence of first round draft pick Milt Morin.

Brewer announced his retirement from professional football in January 1968 to go into the insurance business.
 Later in the year, Brewer decided he would play football again if the Browns would trade him to a team closer to his home and insurance business. The Browns traded him the New Orleans Saints in mid-August. The Browns acquired a 1970 second round draft pick in exchange for Brewer; they used that pick to draft defensive end Joe “Turkey” Jones. Brewer announced his retirement from the Saints in November 1970.

References

1937 births
2011 deaths
Sportspeople from Vicksburg, Mississippi
Players of American football from Mississippi
American football tight ends
American football linebackers
Ole Miss Rebels football players
Cleveland Browns players
New Orleans Saints players
Eastern Conference Pro Bowl players